Ma Muming (born 1930) is a retired Ambassador of the People's Republic of China.

From  to  he was Chargé d'affaires of the embassy of the People's Republic of China in New Delhi.
On June 2, 1974 he represented the government of the People's Republic of China at the coronation of Jigme Singye Wangchuck and was until today the only representative of the government of China to the government of Bhutan.
From  to  he was ambassador in Madrid.
From  1981 to 1984 he was ambassador to Kathmandu.

References

1930 births
Living people
Ambassadors of China to India
Ambassadors of China to Bhutan
Ambassadors of China to Spain
Ambassadors of China to Nepal